Ruth Wood may refer to:
 Ruth Wood, Countess of Halifax, British racehorse owner
 Ruth Goulding Wood, professor of mathematics